LION is the eighth studio album by the rock band Punchline, released as a follow-up to 2015's Thrilled through InVogue Records on March 30, 2018. LION is noted as "a return to form, after the detour into pop nuance taken on 2015's 'Thrilled'".

Track listing

References

Punchline (band) albums
2018 albums
InVogue Records albums